Trzebież  (formerly ) is a village in the administrative district of Gmina Police, within Police County, West Pomeranian Voivodeship, in north-western Poland, close to the German border.

The village has a population of 2,500. It lies on the Szczecin Lagoon, and has a harbour, a marina, a beach and a school of sailing.

History 
Trzebież, known as Ziegenort to its residents while part of Germany until 1945, became part of Poland after the end of World War II in accordance with the Potsdam Agreement, and changed its name to the Polish Trzebież.

Below is a timeline showing the history of the different administrations in which this city has been.

Political-administrative membership
  1815–1866: German Confederation, Kingdom of Prussia, Pomerania
 1866–1871: North German Confederation, Kingdom of Prussia, Pomerania
  1871–1918: German Empire, Kingdom of Prussia, Pomerania
  1919–1933: Weimarer Republik, Free State of Prussia, Pomerania
  1933–1945: Nazi Germany, Pomerania
  1945–1946: Enclave Police, (the area reporting to the Red Army)
  1946–1952: People's Republic of Poland, Szczecin Voivodeship
  1952–1975: People's Republic of Poland, Szczecin Voivodeship
  1975–1989: People's Republic of Poland, Szczecin Voivodeship
  1989–1998: Poland, Szczecin Voivodeship
  1999 - Current: Poland, Western Pomerania, powiat Police County, gmina Police

Monuments
 Parish church in Trzebiez (1745)
 Houses from the 19th century

Demography
 The village has a population:
 1864–1823
 1905–1808
 1925–2382
 1939–2660
 1960–1897
 1972–2240
 2001–2000
 2006–2500

Tourism 
 PTTK path (green footpath  Trail Puszczy Wkrzańskiej-Szlak Puszczy Wkrzańskiej) in an area of Trzebież in Wkrzanska Forest
 Bicycle trail (red  Trail "Puszcza Wkrzańska"-Szlak "Puszcza Wkrzańska") in an area of Trzebież in Wkrzanska Forest
 Łarpia Sail Festival

See also 

 Police
 Szczecin

References

Villages in Police County